Brawlers are an English punk rock band from Leeds, West Yorkshire, England.

History

Formation and debut EP
The band were formed in the summer of 2013 by Harry Johns and Anthony Wright following Johns departure from Dinosaur Pile-Up and the hiatus of Castrovalva, who teamed up with former Leftöver Crack drummer Tom Knox and We Were Frontiers guitarist Matt Wright. In early 2014 the band released their debut EP, I Am a Worthless Piece of Shit was released on Alcopop! Records. Towards the end of 2014,  Kerrang! magazine named Brawlers as one of the 20 hottest bands in the world.

Romantic Errors of Our Youth
Tom Knox left the group in early 2015 and was replaced by Pert, formerly of Beretta Suicide. On 14 January 2015 Brawlers announced that their debut album would be called Romantic Errors of Our Youth and would be released on 6 April 2015 through Alcopop! Records followed by a co-headlineing tour with Max Raptor.

The band have since toured with Set if Off, Decade, Real Friends, Allusondrugs, Lower Than Atlantis, Mooseblood and As It Is. 2016 saw the band head to Australia for a tour with Luca Brasi.

Band members

Current
Anthony Wright - Bass
Pert - Drums
Matthew Wright - Guitar
Harry Johns - Vocals

Former
 Tom Knox- Drums

Discography

Studio albums
 "Romantic Errors of Our Youth" - Alcopop! Records (2015)

EPs
 "I Am a Worthless Piece of Shit" - Alcopop! Records (2014)

Music videos
 Mothers & Fathers (2014)
 Two Minutes (2014)
 Annabel (2015)

References

Underground punk scene in the United Kingdom
Musical groups established in 2013
Punk rock groups from West Yorkshire
Musical groups from Leeds
2013 establishments in England
Alcopop! Records artists